Errikos Litsis (born 1955 in Athens) is a Greek actor. Errikos is best known for his performance as Dimitris in the 2002 cult movie Matchbox and as Takis in the 2005 film Soul Kicking.

Selected filmography
 Matchbox (2002)
 Tsiou (2005)
 Soul Kicking (2006)
 Ores koinis isyhias (2006)
 Parees (2007)
 Small Crime (2008)
 Kantina  (2009)
 Paradise (2011)
 Amerika Square (2016)
 1968 (2018)

References

External links

Greek male actors
21st-century Greek male actors
Year of birth missing (living people)
Living people
Male actors from Athens